Darth Revan, later known simply as Revan, is the player character of the 2003 role-playing video game Star Wars: Knights of the Old Republic and its upcoming remake by BioWare.

A former veteran Jedi knight who lived during the Old Republic Era — approx. 4,000 years before the Skywalker Saga — the Sith Lord Revan forms a Sith Empire to conquer the galaxy, contending with the Republic's armies, only to be betrayed and left for dead by Darth Malak, and subsequently captured by the Jedi, who erase Revan's memories and replace them with a false identity, as part of the Jedi's plan to have Revan rejoin their ranks and help defeat Malak and his Empire. Revan's true identity isn't revealed to the player until later in the game, prior to which their custom character lacks any predefined identity and "Darth Revan" is believed to be dead, returning to villainy or remaining a hero depending upon players' choices and actions.

Revan's gender, class, and facial appearance are chosen and customised by the player. Rino Romano provides the voice for the male Revan, while Charity James voices the female Revan. Since the player can choose the gender of Revan, much of the dialogue revolving around the character is gender-neutral with only a few exceptions. However, in later Star Wars Legends media, Revan is called "he" regardless of player choice for the gender.

Revan's history is expanded and continued in Star Wars: Knights of the Old Republic II: The Sith Lords, as well as related Legends novels and comic books, in particular the 2011 novella Star Wars: The Old Republic: Revan by Drew Karpyshyn, in which it is revealed that both Revan and Malak were captured by the Sith Emperor prior to the first game's events, and brainwashed into becoming his Sith servants. Although they managed to escape his control, the pair remained loyal to the dark side of the Force and went on to form their own Sith Empire. In the massively multiplayer online game Star Wars: The Old Republic, a corrupted Force ghost "remnant" of Revan serves as the eponymous antagonist of the Shadow of Revan expansion, voiced by Jeff Bennett. Following the release of Knights of the Old Republic, Revan quickly became a fan favorite, and is among the most popular non-film characters in the Star Wars franchise, with the character's arc meeting with very positive reviews from critics. Although all works depicting the character became part of the non-canonical Star Wars Expanded Universe (known as Star Wars Legends) in 2014, Revan has had a few canonical references in canon media since 2019.

Appearances

Legends
In April 2014, as a result of its acquisition by The Walt Disney Company, Lucasfilm rebranded most of the licensed Star Wars novels, comics, and video games produced since the originating 1977 film Star Wars as Star Wars Legends and declared them non-canon to the franchise.

Knights of the Old Republic series

Revan is depicted as a former Jedi who, along with his best friend Alek (later Darth Malak), left the Order to lead the fight in the Mandalorian Wars due to the Jedi's inaction. One year after the end of the Mandalorian Wars, Darth Revan and Malak returned to Republic space at the head of a massive invasion fleet. Calling themselves the Sith, they declared war on the Republic. Since their intention was to unite the galaxy under one ruler so they could attack the ancient Sith Empire, they avoided attacking key places such as Coruscant, Onderon, and Dantooine. The Sith won the battle, but as Revan prepared to duel with the Jedi who boarded his flagship, Malak, in the hopes of destroying both Revan and the Jedi, betrayed his Master, ordering the ships under his command to fire on Revan's flagship's bridge. Though Malak believed himself to have been successful in killing Revan, he survived. Revan, severely injured from the turbolaser blasts, was then taken by Bastila Shan and her Jedi strike team to the Jedi Enclave on Dantooine where the Jedi Council members chose to wipe Revan's memory, and imprint him with a false identity that the player creates at the beginning of the game, choosing the character's gender and appearance (canonically, Revan is male).

Knights of the Old Republic begins with Revan awaking on a starship under attack. Throughout the game, Revan learns of his forgotten history and assembles a band of followers as he searches for "Star Maps" to lead him back to the Star Forge, which Revan used to make his army. Revan eventually encounters Malak, who reveals his former identity as a Sith Lord. Malak later captures Bastila and turns her to the dark side. Her ultimate fate depends on player's choice to follow the light side or the dark side throughout the game. Canonically, Revan remains loyal to the light side, defeats Malak, and destroys the Star Forge. The last scene of the game's canonical ending shows the main characters, including Revan, being honored by the Republic at the site of the temple on Rakata Prime; a picture of later events has emerged from subsequent games and novels.

The sequel Knights of the Old Republic II: The Sith Lords reveals that a year after the defeat of Malak, Revan recalled a threat from his time as a Sith Lord, and left known space to deal with it. Clues to the nature of the threat emerge from in-game dialogue with non-player characters (including Canderous and Kreia); this varies according to the player character's alignment and gender.

Prior to the events of the sequel, Revan bade farewell to the nine comrades who had accompanied him on his quest, knowing that none of them could safely accompany him in the places he had to go to; the only NPC with a certain knowledge of where and why Revan left (his navigation droid, T3-M4) won't divulge the information. Also, at the ancient tomb of Ludo Kressh in Korriban, the Jedi Exile fights a silent vision of Darth Revan, in which he appears to wield two lightsabers, one red and one violet. The game lists the color crystal of the lightsaber the player obtains from them as a unique red color. This is Revan's only physical appearance in the entire game. Additionally, the Jedi Exile can speak with several companions and non-player characters within the game to learn more about the history of Revan, and his journey into the Unknown Regions.

The Old Republic: Revan

Revan appears as the primary focus of Star Wars: The Old Republic: Revan, a tie-in book to Star Wars: The Old Republic that was released by Bioware and EA on December 20, 2011.

The Old Republic

Revan re-emerges in Star Wars: The Old Republic after a team of Republic heroes manages to rescue him from the Emperor's Maelstrom Prison with the help of the ghost of the Jedi Exile. It is revealed that Revan was kept alive for centuries as a prisoner by the Emperor to channel Revan's strength in the Force. Revan's link with the Emperor was two-way, however, and he was able to keep the Emperor's darker urges in check, thereby preventing the Emperor from unleashing his full power upon the galaxy before the Republic and Jedi Order had grown enough again to be able to stand a chance against the Sith Empire. Though thankful to the Republic for rescuing him, Revan decides to fight the Emperor on his own terms and takes control of a Rakatan installation called "The Foundry" and engineers a droid army (led by HK-47) programmed to identify and eliminate any target with Sith DNA, which not only included Dark Lords of the Sith but also the majority of citizens of the Empire. Revan's plan is thwarted when a group of Imperials manages to infiltrate the Foundry and destroy the droid army and HK-47 before confronting Revan. After a vicious battle, Revan is defeated but disappears before a killing blow can be delivered.

Revan appears again in the "Legacy of Rakata Prime" flashpoint as the mastermind behind the conspiracy in the "Forged Alliances" plotline. He is the primary antagonist of the fourth digital expansion to The Old Republic, entitled Shadow of Revan, in which he returns to destroy the Republic and Empire. He leads a group of followers known as the Order of Revan or "Revanites", into infiltrating both galactic powers and influencing them into annihilating each other. Some Republic and Imperial forces also declare themselves loyal to Revan. Revan then draws the Empire and Republic into a battle with his Revanite ships over the planet Rishi, so that neither the Republic nor the Empire can interfere when he confronts the Emperor. However, his plan is thwarted when the player character sends a communication to Republic and Imperial ships informing them of Revan's plan and telling them to cease all fire.

Revan is later cornered on Yavin 4 where he tries to raise the Emperor but is confronted and defeated by the player and an alliance of Republic and Imperial characters. After the Emperor makes his presence known and leaves Yavin 4, an apparition of Revan appears and reveals that when he was defeated in the Foundry, only his light side became one with the Force, while his dark side, fueled by hate for the Emperor, survived, setting off the "Forged Alliances" plotline. The two sides of Revan, one Jedi, the other Sith, then reunite, with his now-whole spirit warning the player and his allies that they must undo what he has done, lest otherwise the Emperor will see his evil plans through and everything will be lost.

In the Echoes of Oblivion story, Revan's spirit returns to aid the player character in defeating the duplicate spirit of the Sith Emperor before he can possess Satele Shan.

Other appearances
In Darth Bane: Path of Destruction, Revan appears as a holographic avatar for a holocron discovered by Darth Bane.

In celebration of KotOR 15th anniversary, Electronic Arts added the Jedi Knight variant of Revan to Star Wars: Galaxy of Heroes as a playable character on October 18, 2018. Months later, the Sith version, Darth Revan, was included in the game as the first unlockable Dark Side mythic character, followed by Darth Malak.

Canon
Revan was originally slated to appear in the animated series Star Wars: The Clone Wars. In the third-season episode "Ghosts of Mortis," Revan would have appeared as a Sith Lord alongside Darth Bane as advisors to the Son, a dark side embodiment. Revan was cut from the episode in late production since their presence would conflict with Lucas' view of the Force at the time.

The visual dictionary guide for the 2019 film Star Wars: The Rise of Skywalker contains a reference to one of the Sith Eternal's legions being named after Darth Revan.

Revan's name is chanted by the Sith cultists in the novel Shadow of the Sith.

Merchandising
In 2007, Hasbro toys released an action figure of Darth Revan. Revan received the second-highest number of votes in the 2006 ToyFare Fan's Choice Poll to determine the most requested Star Wars action figure. The highest number of votes was for Quinlan Vos, a Jedi who appeared in comic books and who Hasbro had already slated to be released in 2007 before the poll was conducted.

In 2009, Hasbro released a Darth Revan Mighty Mugg.

In 2014, Lego released a Darth Revan Minifigure as a free-with-purchase promotional item from May 3–5.

Revan won the 2015 Black Series Fan Choice Poll at San Diego Comic-Con, with a Darth Revan (from Star Wars: Knights of the Old Republic) figure released in late 2016.

A GameStop exclusive Black Series figure of Jedi Knight Revan from Star Wars: Galaxy of Heroes was released in February 2020.

A GameStop exclusive Funko Pop! of Darth Revan from Star Wars: Knights of the Old Republic was released in July 2020.

Reception
Revan was chosen by IGN as the 12th greatest Star Wars character, as well as also being chosen by IGN's Jesse Schedeen as, along with Darth Malak, the fifth best Star Wars villain. IGN's readers chose Revan as their 7th top Star Wars character. UGO Networks put the character as the ninth top Star Wars expanded universe character. Jesse Schedeen listed Revan as one of the Star Wars character that she wanted in Soulcalibur, calling him "one of the rare Expanded Universe characters that unquestionably stands alongside the best of the movie characters." Robert Workman, from GameDaily, listed the character as one of his favourite Star Wars video game characters.

Although Revan ultimately did not make the cut, Game Informer staff considered his inclusion in their "30 characters that defined a decade" collection, with Matt Miller saying, "in Star Wars: Knights of the Old Republic, the looming shadow of [Revan's] presence hangs over everything, and the Revan-centric twist at the heart of the story shocked the gaming world."

Edge considered the revelation that the player character is Darth Revan to be one of the most jaw-dropping moments in video games. GameDaily's Chris Buffa listed the moment as the fourth top video game spoiler, and Robert Workman listed the moment as one of the eight BioWare moments that shocked him. Connor Sheridan of GamesRadar described Revan on remake's trailer as "looking sinister as ever".

Further reading

References

External links

BioWare characters
Star Wars comics characters
Star Wars Legends characters
Star Wars video game characters
Star Wars Sith characters
Star Wars Jedi characters
Star Wars: Knights of the Old Republic characters
Video game characters introduced in 2003
Fictional characters with amnesia
Fictional empaths
Fictional generals
Fictional ghosts
Extraterrestrial supervillains
Fictional knights in video games
Fictional mass murderers
Fictional prison escapees
Fictional racing drivers
Fictional swordfighters in video games
Fictional telekinetics
Fictional telepaths
Fictional war veterans
Fictional warlords in video games
Male characters in video games
Video game bosses
Video game characters of selectable gender
Video game protagonists